Here is a list of notable former and current ESPN Radio national personalities.

Current ESPN Radio personalities

A–L

Doug Brown: 1993–present (ESPN Radio SportsCenter and SportsCenter Nightly)
 Chris Canty: 2021–present (Canty & Golic Jr. 2021-22, Canty & Carlin 2022-present)
 Joe D'Ambrosio: 1996–present (MLB on ESPN Radio and ESPN Radio SportsCenter)
 Jason Fitz: 2020–present (First Take Your Take, Spain and Fitz)
 Mike Greenberg: 1999–2017 (Mike and Mike); 2020-present (Greeny)
 Alan Hahn: 2021–present (Bart & Hahn)
 Keyshawn Johnson: 2020–present (Keyshawn, JWill and Max)
Matt Jones: 2020–present (Sunday NFL Countdown) 
 Max Kellerman: 2020–present (The Max Kellerman Show (2020–21); Keyshawn, JWill and Max (2021–present)
Marc Kestecher: 1999–present (NBA on ESPN Radio, MLB on ESPN Radio, ESPN Radio SportsCenter and NIT on ESPN Radio)
 Mel Kiper Jr.: 1992–present (ESPN Radio College Gameday and Dari and Mel)
 Christine Lisi) 1990–present ESPN Radio SportsCenter

M–Z

Jay Reynolds: ?–present (ESPN Radio SportsCenter and SportsCenter AM)
 Bart Scott: 2021–present (Bart & Hahn)
Dan Shulman: 2002–present (MLB on ESPN Radio)
Chris Singleton: 2011–present (MLB on ESPN Radio)
Sarah Spain: 2015–present (Spain & Prim, The Trifecta, Izzy & Spain, Spain & Fitz and Spain & Company)
 Bob Valvano: 1998–present (The V Show with Bob Valvano and NIT on ESPN Radio)
 Jay Williams: 2020–present (Keyshawn, JWill and Max)

Former ESPN Radio personalities

A–L
 Tony Bruno: 1992–1998 (Bruno-Golic Morning Show and GameNight)
 Will Cain: 2018–2020 (The Ryen Russillo Show and The Will Cain Show)
 Dave Campbell: 1995–2010 (MLB on ESPN Radio)
John Clayton: 1995–2017 (The Huddle)
 Colin Cowherd: 2004–2015 (The Herd with Colin Cowherd)
Dan Davis: 1992–2011 (ESPN Radio SportsCenter)
 Rob Dibble: 1999–2004 (The Dan Patrick Show)
 Gerry DiNardo: 2005–2007 (ESPN Radio College GameDay)
Jim Durham: 1992–2012 (NBA on ESPN Radio)
 Doug Gottlieb: 2003–2012 (The Pulse and The Doug Gottlieb Show)
 Mike Golic: 1998–2020 (Mike and Mike and Golic and Wingo)
 Mike Golic Jr.: 2017–2022 (Golic and Wingo, Canty & Golic Jr.)
 David Jacoby (sportscaster): 2015-? (Jalen & Jacoby)
Bomani Jones: 2015-2017 (The Right Time with Bomani Jones)
Danny Kanell: 2015-2017 (The Scott Van Pelt Show)
Andy Katz: 2004–2017 (ESPN Radio College GameDay)
Tony Kornheiser: 1998–2004 (The Tony Kornheiser Show)
Erik Kuselias: 2003–2010 (The SportsBrothers, The SportsBash and The Eric Kuselias Show)
 Amy Lawrence: 2006–2012 (ESPN Radio Gameday Saturday)
Dan Le Batard: 2013–2021 (The Dan Le Batard Show with Stugotz)

M–Z

 Todd McShay: 2005–2009 (ESPN Radio College GameDay)
 Zubin Mehenti: 2020-2021 (Keyshawn, JWill and Zubin)
Jon Miller: 1998–2010 (MLB on ESPN Radio)
Joe Morgan: 1998–2010 (MLB on ESPN Radio)
 Chiney Ogwumike: 2020-2021 (Chiney and Golic Jr.)
 Dan Patrick: 1989–2007  (The Dan Patrick Show)
 Bob Picozzi: 1998–2017 (ESPN Radio SportsCenter)
 Andy Pollin: 1998–2004 (The Tony Kornheiser Show and ESPN Radio College GameDay)
Dave Revsine: 2005–2007 (ESPN Radio College GameDay)
 Dr. Jack Ramsay: 1992–2005 (NBA on ESPN Radio)
 Jeff Rickard: 2006–2009 (GameNight)
John Rooke: 1999–2011 (ESPN Radio College GameDay and GameNight)
Jalen Rose: 2015–? (Jalen & Jacoby)
Ryen Russillo: 2007–2017 (The Baseball Show, ESPN Radio College GameDay and The Scott Van Pelt Show)
 Sean Salisbury: 2003–2008 (The Huddle)
 Mike Schopp: 2002–2006 (ESPN Radio College GameDay)
Jon Sciambi: 2010–2020 (MLB on ESPN Radio)
 John Seibel: 2000–2009 (GameNight, The NFL on ESPN Radio and The Baseball Show)
Stephen A. Smith: 2007–2008, 2017–2020 (The Stephen A. Smith Show)
Mike Tirico: 2006–2016 (NBA on ESPN Radio)
Scott Van Pelt: 2008–2015 (Tirico & Van Pelt and The Scott Van Pelt Show)
Chuck Wilson: 1991–2011 (GameNight)
Trey Wingo: 2017–2020 (Golic and Wingo)
Jon "Stugotz" Weiner: 2013–2021 (The Dan Le Batard Show with Stugotz)
 Todd Wright: 1996–2005 (AllNight with Todd Wright)

References
 ESPNRadio.com

See also
 List of ESPN personalities

ESPN Radio
ESPN announcers
American radio personalities by network
American radio sports announcers